Tiger Shark (Todd Arliss) is a fictional character, a supervillain appearing in American comic books published by Marvel Comics. He is usually depicted as an enemy of Namor.

Publication history

The character first appears in Prince Namor, the Sub-Mariner #5 (September 1968) and was created by writer Roy Thomas and artist John Buscema.

Fictional character biography
Todd Arliss is a selfish Olympic swimmer who, seeking public acclaim, attempts to rescue a drowning man. In the process, Arliss suffers a spinal cord injury when waves push him into a ship. Desperate to regain his swimming ability, Arliss willingly participates in an experiment by the scientist Doctor Dorcas who "cures" his injured back by blending his DNA with that of hero Namor the Sub-Mariner and a tiger shark. Although successful, the process changed Arliss both physically and mentally, endowing him with razor-sharp teeth and gills and making him savage and predatory.

Becoming a supervillain and calling himself Tiger Shark, the character finds and threatens the Lady Dorma and by force demands to be crowned Lord of Atlantis. Namor, however, deposes Tiger Shark and the character is imprisoned in Atlantis. Tiger Shark escapes from Atlantis during a rebellion caused by the artifact the Serpent Crown and encounters Namor once again.

Tiger Shark battles Orka, the minion of Atlantean noble Warlord Krang. The pair cause an undersea avalanche that buries them for several months.

Once free, Tiger Shark discovers he is losing his powers and teams with the villainess Llyra against Namor and his allies Stingray and Fantastic Four member the Human Torch. Tiger Shark's powers are restored by Llyra, and Tiger Shark accidentally kills Namor's father, Leonard Mackenzie, as the villains retreat. After encountering the Hulk at Niagara Falls the character reunites with Dr. Dorcas and battles Namor and the hero Spider-Man. On this occasion, Tiger Shark is savagely beaten by Namor and left for dead. Tiger Shark, Dr. Dorcas and Atlantean warlord Attuma seize the island Hydrobase and again battle Namor, who allied with Doctor Doom. Dorcas is accidentally crushed to death, with Tiger Shark and Attuma being defeated and imprisoned.

Tiger Shark escapes from Hydrobase and abducts Namor's cousin Namorita before being recaptured by heroine Ms. Marvel.

Tiger Shark joins the supervillain team the Masters of Evil who battle the Avengers. With the Masters of Evil, Tiger Shark aids villain Egghead in a plan to ruin Henry Pym, but is ultimately defeated by Pym. Tiger Shark joins Baron Zemo's version of the Masters of Evil and invades Avengers Mansion, escaping when the Avengers retake their headquarters. The character flees with fellow Masters member Whirlwind to California, where both are captured by Avengers West Coast members Tigra and Hellcat.

During the Acts of Vengeance storyline Tiger Shark battles Wolverine; feigns illness to escape prison, and eventually battles Stingray. Tiger Shark ceases the hostilities to help rescue his sister, who is trapped in a cave-in. After being captured for study and then rescued by Namor, a grateful Tiger Shark renounces crime. Renaming himself Arlys Tigershark, he marries a woman from an undersea tribe of nomads. However, he reverts to his savage ways when his pregnant wife and her tribe are slaughtered by savage undersea creatures called the Faceless Ones. He aids Namor against Suma-ket, the master of the Faceless Ones, who leads an attack on Atlantis that fails when Suma-Ket is killed in battle. Together with the Inhuman Triton and the Fantastic Four, Tiger Shark reluctantly aids Namor against an attacking alien and after a battle with Namor clone Llyron features as part of the team Deep Six and battles the Avengers.

In Thunderbolts, Tiger Shark has inexplicably mutated into a more shark-like being, complete with grey skin and a natural fin as opposed to a costume ornament. Tiger Shark joins Justine Hammer's version of the Masters of Evil and has several skirmishes with maverick superheroes the Thunderbolts.

Tiger Shark — once again in human form — joins Attuma's version of Deep Six (consisting of Nagala, Orka, Piranha, and Sea Urchin) to conquer Atlantis, initially successful the villains are eventually defeated, with Tiger Shark quickly defeated by cosmic hero the Silver Surfer.

The character appears next — again in mutated form — in the title She-Hulk, and is imprisoned in the prison facility called the Big House, where inmates are kept at miniature size. Escaping with several other inmates at microscopic size by riding on the back of heroine She-Hulk's hand, Tiger Shark and the other villains emerge and attack when she visits a law firm. Tiger Shark is defeated when She-Hulk throws the villain Electro into the water he is standing in, electrocuting Tiger Shark and short circuiting Electro. Tiger Shark appears (in human form) during the mass supervillain breakout at prison facility the Raft and is recaptured, along with fellow villain Armadillo, by the group the New Warriors. The character is seen briefly as an employee of the criminal the Owl in the limited series Underworld.

In the 2007 limited series Fallen Son: The Death of Captain America, Tiger Shark steals an artifact called the "Horn of Gabriel", and uses it to summon huge sea monsters and direct them against the surface world. He is, however, defeated by the Mighty Avengers. Tiger Shark also features as part of a supervillain enclave being solicited by new crime boss the Hood, who hopes to take advantage of the split in the superhero community caused by the Superhuman Registration Act.

Al Kraven, the son of long-time Spider-Man foe Kraven the Hunter, briefly captures Tiger Shark when collecting animal-themed superhumans. Tiger Shark attempts to extort money from Norman Osborn, the leader of a revamped version of the Thunderbolts, but is beaten into submission by Venom and forced to secretly work for Osborn.

During the 2008 "Secret Invasion" storyline, Ms. Marvel saves Tiger Shark from being killed by an alien Super-Skrull in Raft. Tiger Shark also skirmishes with the mercenary character Deadpool at the direction of Osborn. The Elder of the Universe the Grandmaster also recruits the character to be part of a team called the Offenders in a bid to thwart the Hulk.

Tiger Shark joins a new version of the Lethal Legion, led by the Grim Reaper, in a three issue limited series which ties into the 2008-09 "Dark Reign" storyline.

During the 2011 "Fear Itself" storyline, Liz Allan and Normie encounter two men, one of whom was wounded by Tiger Shark during his bank robbery. Tiger Shark later joins Attuma (in the form of Nerkodd: Breaker of Oceans), Tyrak, and Attuma's sister Aradnea in taking over New Atlantis. As Namor and his allies fight off Nerkodd's forces and the Undying Ones, Loa is attacked by what appears to be a two-headed Tiger Shark.

During the 2016 "Avengers: Standoff!" storyline, Tiger Shark was an inmate of Pleasant Hill, a gated community established by S.H.I.E.L.D.

Tiger Shark attacked a cruise ship which Stingray and Diane Newell were on. Stingray fights Tiger Shark which continues underwater. Namor breaks up the fight and demands their allegiance. After Stingray is attacked by War Sharks summoned by Namor when he tried to reason with him, Tiger Shark reluctantly took up Namor's offer and became a member of his Defenders of the Deep.

Powers and abilities
Before gaining his powers, Todd Arliss was a record-breaking Olympic swimmer but otherwise an ordinary human. After Dr. Dorcas' experimental genetic engineering process, he becomes an amphibious humanoid with the traits of a human, an Atlantean (Homo mermanus), and a tiger shark. As Tiger Shark, he possesses the same, albeit weaker superhuman strength, stamina, water speed and durability compared to Namor, although he must be immersed in water to achieve his full strength as he weakens outside of the water. On land, he must wear his special costume containing a water circulation system which bathes him with a thin layer of water, to retain his strength. Tiger Shark also possesses an innate hunting instinct inherited from his shark genes, as once he locks onto prey he cannot stop tracking it until it has been captured or he has been forcibly repulsed. He has the ability to survive indefinitely underwater via gills on his cheeks and has razor-pointed adamantium teeth. Tiger Shark gained the tenuous ability to shift between a more monstrous shark form and his humanoid state, either given to him by the thieves' guild or something he grew into over his criminal career. This vastly increased his physical abilities due to excess bulk and muscle mass, and he even gained a healing factor powerful enough to regenerate damaged brain tissue over time.

During the "Fear Itself" event, Todd was temporarily mutated via mysticism into a twin-headed monstrosity through the craft of the Undying Ones.

Other versions
 In the alternate timeline of the 1995–96 "Age of Apocalypse" storyline, Tiger Shark is one of Dark Beast's secret creations, concocted in his lab in The Yucatán and kept away from both Mister Sinister and Apocalypse. The Exiles encounter him in Dark Beast's lab while searching for lab notes for the M'Kraan Crystal.
 In the Ultimate Marvel universe, Tiger Shark is a pre-cataclysm Atlantean who is more bestial than the mainstream Marvel version. During the 2009 "Ultimatum" storyline, the Thing, Invisible Woman, and Dr. Arthur Molekevic fight Doctor Dorcas alongside Namora and Tiger Shark in Atlantis and defeat him.
 In the alternate reality of the 2008 Marvel Apes miniseries, Tiger Shark is a gorilla named Tigorilla.
 In a 2014 storyline in The Amazing Spider-Man, following Spider-Man's defeat of Goblin King, it was revealed that Roderick Kingsley sold one of Tiger Shark's old costumes to an unnamed criminal as seen when he and the other former Hobgoblin minions encounter Electro at the Bar with No Name. During the 2014 "AXIS" storyline, Tiger Shark was among the supervillains that Missile Mate assembled to join the side of Phil Urich (who was operating as Goblin King) and the remnants of the Goblin Nation upon claiming that Roderick Kingsley "abandoned" them.

In other media

Television
 Tiger Shark appears in The Avengers: United They Stand episode "Command Decision", voiced by Carlos Diaz. This version is a member of the Masters of Evil.
 Tiger Shark appears in Marvel Disk Wars: The Avengers, voiced by Tarusuke Shingake in the Japanese version. This version is a member of the Masters of Evil.
 The Ultimate Marvel incarnation of Tiger Shark appears in the Avengers Assemble episode "Shadow of Atlantis", voiced by Matthew Mercer. This version is a former general of Attuma's who rebelled against Atlantis in protest of the treaty between his homeland and the surface world and secretly a member of the mysterious Shadow Council, who seek to conquer Atlantis, Wakanda, and the world.

Video games
Tiger Shark appears as a boss in Marvel: Ultimate Alliance, voiced by Beau Weaver.

Miscellaneous
In 2015, Marvel Legends released a figure of Tiger Shark in the Infinite Series Ant-Man wave.

References

External links
 Tiger Shark at Marvel.com
 

Characters created by John Buscema
Characters created by Roy Thomas
Comics characters introduced in 1968
Fictional characters with superhuman durability or invulnerability
Marvel Comics characters who are shapeshifters
Marvel Comics characters who can move at superhuman speeds
Marvel Comics characters with accelerated healing
Marvel Comics characters with superhuman strength
Marvel Comics hybrids
Marvel Comics mutates
Marvel Comics supervillains